Tales from the Hudson is Michael Brecker's fourth album as a leader. It was recorded at the Power Station in New York City in 1996. The album won Brecker two Grammy awards for Best Jazz Instrumental Solo (for his solo on "Cabin Fever") and Best Jazz Instrumental Album, Individual or Group.

Track listing

Personnel 
 Michael Brecker – tenor saxophone
Pat Metheny – guitar, guitar synthesizer (track 3)
Joey Calderazzo – piano (except tracks 3 and 5)
Dave Holland – double bass
Jack DeJohnette – drums
McCoy Tyner – piano (3, 5)
Don Alias – percussion (3, 5)

Awards 
1997 – 40th Annual GRAMMY Awards

References 

1996 albums
Michael Brecker albums
Impulse! Records albums
Grammy Award for Best Jazz Instrumental Album